The Longview metropolitan statistical area is a metropolitan area in Northeast Texas that covers three counties—Gregg, Rusk, and Upshur. As of the 2010 census the MSA had a population of 280,000 (though a July 1, 2019 estimate placed the population at 286,657). It is also part of the larger Longview-Marshall combined statistical area.

Counties 

 Gregg
 Rusk
 Upshur

Communities

Places with more than 50,000 people 

 Longview (Principal city)

Places with 10,000 to 25,000 people 

 Henderson 
 Kilgore

Places with 1,000 to 10,000 people 

 Big Sandy
 Gilmer
 Gladewater 
 Ore City
 Overton (partial)
 Tatum (partial)
 White Oak

Places with 500 to 1,000 people 

 Clarksville City
 East Mountain
 Easton 
 Lakeport
 Mount Enterprise 
 New London

Places with fewer than 500 people 

 Reklaw (partial)
 Union Grove
 Warren City

Unincorporated communities 

 Concord
 Diana 
 Elderville 
 Joinerville
 Judson 
 Laird Hill 
 Laneville 
 Leverett's Chapel 
 Liberty City
 Price
 Selman City
 Turnertown

Demographics 

As of the census of 2000, there were 194,042 people, 73,341 households, and 52,427 families residing within the MSA. The racial makeup of the MSA was 75.71% White, 17.93% African American, 0.50% Native American, 0.48% Asian, 0.02% Pacific Islander, 4.02% from other races, and 1.33% from two or more races. Hispanic or Latino of any race were 8.03% of the population.

The median income for a household in the MSA was $33,750 and the median income for a family was $40,220. Males had a median income of $31,786 versus $20,570 for females. The per capita income for the MSA was $17,160.

See also 

 List of cities in Texas
 Texas census statistical areas
 List of Texas metropolitan areas

References 

 
Geography of Gregg County, Texas
Geography of Upshur County, Texas
Geography of Rusk County, Texas